A.F.C. Portchester is a football club based in Portchester, a suburb of the town of Fareham, Hampshire, England.

History

The club was established in 1971 as Loyds Sports. They joined Division Six of the City of Portsmouth Sunday League. After amalgamating with Colourvision Rangers in 1973 they gained a place in Division Two. In 1976 the club became Wicor Mill, after which they joined the Portsmouth & District League. The club were runners-up in the Portsmouth & District League in 1997–98 and were promoted to Division Three of the Hampshire League; the following year they adopted their current name. Division Three was also renamed Division Two, and the club were runners-up in 1999–2000, earning promotion to Division One.

Portchester were Division One champions in 2001–02, but were unable to take promotion to the Wessex League due to a lack of floodlights. However, in 2004 they became founder members of the new Division Three of the Wessex League when the Hampshire League merged into it. Division Three was renamed Division Two in 2006, and the club were promoted to Division One after finishing fourth in 2006–07. In 2011–12 they were Division One runners-up, earning promotion to the Premier Division. In 2014–15 they won the Wessex League's League Cup.

Honours
Wessex League
League Cup winners 2014–15
Hampshire League
Division One champions 2001–02
Russell Cotes Cup
Winners 2013–14, 2016-17

Records
Best FA Cup performance: Second qualifying round, 2013–14, 2015–16, 2016–17, 2017–18
Best FA Vase performance: Third round, 2013–14, 2014–15

See also
A.F.C. Portchester players
A.F.C. Portchester managers

References

External links
Official website

 
Football clubs in England
Football clubs in Hampshire
Association football clubs established in 1976
1976 establishments in England
Borough of Fareham
Hampshire League
Wessex Football League